List of Enigma machine simulators lists software implementations of the Enigma machine, a rotor cypher device that was invented by German engineer Arthur Scherbius at the end of World War I. and used in the early- to mid-20th century to protect commercial, diplomatic, and military communication.

List of Enigma simulators

References

External links
 An online Enigma Machine simulator
 Enigma simulation
 Universal Enigma simulator

Simulation software
Enigma machine